Valdo Cândido Filho (born 12 January 1964), simply known as Valdo, is a Brazilian former footballer who played as a central midfielder, and a current manager of Congo national football team.

In a senior career which spanned more than two decades, he played professionally – other than in his own country – in Portugal, France and Japan.

Having appeared more than 40 times for Brazil, Valdo represented the nation in two World Cups and as many Copa América tournaments.

Club career
Born in Siderópolis, Santa Catarina, Valdo began playing football with Figueirense Futebol Clube, making his professional debuts with Grêmio Football Porto-Alegrense, with which he won four consecutive Rio Grande do Sul Leagues.

In the summer of 1988 he signed with S.L. Benfica of Portugal alongside compatriot Ricardo Gomes, a central defender. Both were important elements in their debut season as the team won the Primeira Liga championship, a feat which was again accomplished in 1991, with the midfielder netting five goals in 26 matches.

Both Valdo and Gomes left for Paris Saint-Germain F.C. in the 1991 summer, and both would return four years later to the Lisbon side, having won a total of four titles, including the 1993–94 edition of the Ligue 1. In his second Benfica spell, he played in 30 league matches in each of his two seasons, winning the Taça de Portugal in 1996.

Aged 32, Valdo joined J1 League club Nagoya Grampus Eight, and returned to his country after two slow years. He would continue to play until the age of 40, representing six teams in quick succession (he ended his career after having helped Botafogo de Futebol e Regatas achieve its return to the Série A).

Valdo began working as a manager in 2009, in Brazilian amateur football. Five years later, he rejoined his former Benfica boss Artur Jorge at MC Alger from Algeria.

International career
Valdo earned 45 caps for the Brazil national team, during six years. Before having made his first appearance he was called to the 1986 FIFA World Cup squad, but did not play one single second.

In the 1990 edition in Italy, Valdo was already a starter, and took part in the country's four matches in the tournament, including the round-of-16 1–0 loss against Argentina.

Personal life
Upon retiring from football, Valdo settled in Portugal with his Portuguese wife. The couple had one daughter, Tatiele, who died in a car accident at only 13.

Career statistics

Club

International

Honours

Club
Grêmio
 Campeonato Gaúcho: 1985, 1986, 1987, 1988

Benfica
 Primeira Liga: 1988–89, 1990–91
 Taça de Portugal: 1995–96; Runner-up 1988–89, 1996–97
 Supertaça Cândido de Oliveira: 1989
 European Cup: Runner-up 1989–90

Paris Saint-Germain
 Ligue 1: 1993–94
 Coupe de France: 1992–93, 1994–95
 Coupe de la Ligue: 1994–95

Cruzeiro
 Campeonato Mineiro: 1998
 Recopa Sudamericana: 1999
 Copa Centro-Oeste: 1999

International
Brazil
 Copa América: 1989
 Pan American Games: 1987
 Pre-Olympic tournament: 1987
 Rous Cup: 1987

Individual
 Bola de Prata (Silver Ball): 1998

References

External links
 
 
 
 

1964 births
Living people
Sportspeople from Santa Catarina (state)
Brazilian footballers
Association football midfielders
Campeonato Brasileiro Série A players
Campeonato Brasileiro Série B players
Figueirense FC players
Grêmio Foot-Ball Porto Alegrense players
Cruzeiro Esporte Clube players
Santos FC players
Clube Atlético Mineiro players
Esporte Clube Juventude players
Associação Desportiva São Caetano players
Botafogo de Futebol e Regatas players
Primeira Liga players
S.L. Benfica footballers
Ligue 1 players
Paris Saint-Germain F.C. players
J1 League players
Nagoya Grampus players
Brazil international footballers
1986 FIFA World Cup players
1990 FIFA World Cup players
1987 Copa América players
1989 Copa América players
Copa América-winning players
Olympic footballers of Brazil
Footballers at the 1988 Summer Olympics
Olympic silver medalists for Brazil
Olympic medalists in football
Medalists at the 1988 Summer Olympics
Pan American Games gold medalists for Brazil
Pan American Games medalists in football
Brazilian expatriate footballers
Expatriate footballers in Portugal
Expatriate footballers in France
Expatriate footballers in Japan
Brazilian expatriate sportspeople in Portugal
Brazilian expatriate sportspeople in France
Brazilian expatriate sportspeople in Japan
Brazilian football managers
Brazilian expatriate sportspeople in Algeria
Footballers at the 1987 Pan American Games
União Esporte Clube managers
Medalists at the 1987 Pan American Games